The Drisht Castle Church is a church in Drisht Castle, in Drisht, Shkodër County, Albania. It is a Cultural Monument of Albania.

References

Cultural Monuments of Albania
Buildings and structures in Shkodër